Richard Scott Hirtensteiner (born October 9, 1967) is the head coach for the Pepperdine Waves baseball team as of December 2020. He previously played at Pepperdine for four years, earning All-American honors in 1989. In 1987, he represented the United States in the Pan American Games. From 1989 to 1994, he played professionally.

Playing career
In 877 at-bats at Pepperdine, he hit .336 with 27 home runs and 176 RBI. In his All-American senior year, he slashed .366/.469/.620 with 12 home runs, 41 RBI and 13 steals. In the 1987 Pan American Games, he batted .409. In 1988, he played collegiate summer baseball with the Harwich Mariners of the Cape Cod Baseball League (CCBL) and was named a league all-star.

He was drafted three times, last by the California Angels in the 8th round of the 1989 Major League Baseball Draft. He played in the Angels system through 1990 before joining the unaffiliated Salt Lake City Trappers in 1991. With them, he hit .356 with 11 home runs and 20 RBI in 70 games. He joined the Montreal Expos system in 1992, played briefly at Triple-A in 1993 (spending most of the year in the  independent ranks) and finished his career in the Florida Marlins system in 1994.

Coaching career
He later became an assistant coach at Lamar University before joining Pepperdine as an assistant. In 1998, he returned to the CCBL as an assistant coach for the Yarmouth–Dennis Red Sox He became Pepperdine's head coach in 2015.

Head coaching record

References

1967 births
Living people
All-American college baseball players
American expatriate baseball players in Canada
Baseball coaches from California
Baseball outfielders
Baseball players at the 1987 Pan American Games
Baseball players from California
Bend Bucks players
Brevard County Manatees players
Cape Cod Baseball League coaches
Harrisburg Senators players
Harwich Mariners players
Lamar Cardinals baseball coaches
Ottawa Lynx players
Palm Springs Angels players
Pan American Games medalists in baseball
Pan American Games silver medalists for the United States
Pepperdine Waves baseball coaches
Pepperdine Waves baseball players
Portland Sea Dogs players
Quad Cities Angels players
Salt Lake City Trappers players
Sportspeople from Ventura County, California
St. Paul Saints players
Medalists at the 1987 Pan American Games
Mat-Su Miners players
Lamar University alumni